Andreas Hölzl (born 16 March 1985) is an Austrian footballer who currently plays for SV Brixen in the Landesliga Ost (Tyrol).

Club career
In summer 2014, Hölzl returned to Wacker Innsbruck after having spent six years with Sturm Graz. He signed for three years until 2017 and joined the club on a free transfer.

References

External links
 

1985 births
Living people
Austrian footballers
Austria international footballers
SK Sturm Graz players
FC Wacker Innsbruck (2002) players
Austrian Football Bundesliga players
2. Liga (Austria) players
Footballers from Tyrol (state)

Association football midfielders